Route 1 is a highway in the Canada province of Newfoundland and Labrador, and is the easternmost stretch of the Trans-Canada Highway. Route 1 is the primary east–west road on the island of Newfoundland.

The eastern terminus of Route 1 is St. John's.  From there, the highway crosses the island  to Channel-Port aux Basques, its western terminus.

From there, the Trans-Canada Highway is carried across the Cabot Strait by ferry to North Sydney, Nova Scotia.

Route description

The following description details the highway from its eastern terminus to its western terminus.

Route 1's official eastern terminus is at the interchange with Logy Bay Road in the northeastern part of the city.  The highway begins as a freeway, proceeding west on the Outer Ring Road.  Route 1 maintains the name Outer Ring Road, intersecting with St. John's roads such as Aberdeen Avenue, Portugal Cove Road, Torbay Road, Allandale Road, Thorburn Road, Topsail Road and Kenmount Road until the interchange with Pitts Memorial Drive, 20 km to the west.

Route 1 proceeds in a generally southwestern direction for another 25 km as it follows the southern shore of Conception Bay (several kilometres inland) until it reaches the interchange with Route 13 where it turns west and then northwest, continuing for another 29 km on a 4-lane expressway to Whitbourne where the freeway ends at the interchange with Route 80/81.

Route 1 transitions to a 2-lane controlled access highway and continues northwest from Whitbourne along the isthmus of the Avalon Peninsula and 188 km north to Glovertown, bypassing Clarenville, small communities like Arnold's Cove, Goobies and passing through Terra Nova National Park; park admission is not required to use Route 1. The Bonavista Peninsula and Burin Peninsula can be accessed via interchanges near Clarenville and Goobies, respectively.

From Glovertown, the highway proceeds northwest 182 km to Badger, bypassing Gander, Glenwood. Lewisporte (about 11 km north on Route 340), Norris Arm Bishop's Falls and Grand Falls-Windsor; Route 1 has a 6 km 4-lane section through Grand Falls-Windsor. As of August 2008, there are no gas stations along the highway between the towns of Gander and Bishop's Falls. The Isles of Notre Dame region of the province, which includes Fogo, the Twillingate Islands, New World Island and surrounding areas, can be accessed via Route 340 at the Notre Dame Junction interchange near Lewisporte. The Bay d'Espoir region can be accessed via the Bay D'Espoir Highway near Botwood. Botwood, Point Leamington and Leading Tickles can be accessed via the Botwood Highway, officially Route 350 at an interchange in the Bishop's Falls-Grand Falls-Windsor area.

From Badger, Route 1 heads due north for 64 km to Springdale where the highway swings southwest for 137 km to Pasadena, passing through Deer Lake.

At Pasadena, the highway transitions to a 4-lane expressway and continues southwest along the south shore of Deer Lake before following the Humber River through the narrow Humber Valley.  The 4-lane section proceeds for 38 km in a southwest direction, where it transitions back to a 2-lane controlled access highway west of the interchange with Route 450 (Lewin Parkway), southwest of Corner Brook.

From the Confederation Drive interchange, Route 1 proceeds for 213 km in a southwest direction, bypassing Stephenville (accessible via Route 460 and Route 490) and passing through the Codroy Valley (where it is a 2-lane uncontrolled access highway) to Port aux Basques.  It terminates southeast of the town at the Marine Atlantic ferry terminal.

Outer Ring Road
New highway construction during the 1990s extended Route 1 on what is called the Outer Ring Road to the interchange with Logy Bay Road in the northeast part of St. John's, including passing by the Stavanger Drive Shopping Area. The bypass opened in phases moving increasingly eastward from Kenmount Road to Logy Bay Road, between 1998 and 2003. Prior to this construction, Route 1 and the Trans-Canada Highway designation began at St. John's City Hall on New Gower Street and proceeded west on Pitts Memorial Drive and then on the current alignment of Route 1 to the southwest.  It is for this reason that the city named its hockey arena and convention centre Mile One Centre, adjacent to the city hall.

To follow an unofficial alignment of Route 1 from St. John's City Hall, one must head geographically east for 1.5 km into the southeastern part of the city, continuing onto Duckworth Street (Route 60).  Proceed north for 1 km on Ordnance Street and King's Bridge Road before turning east for 1.5 km along the north shore of Quidi Vidi Lake on The Boulevard.

Continue north on East White Hills Road, which becomes controlled access several hundred metres north of its intersection with The Boulevard.  The East White Hills Road transitions into the Outer Ring Road 4 km to the north at the interchange with the Logy Bay Road.

Exit list

References

External links

001
Newfoundland 001
Conception Bay South
Corner Brook
Grand Falls-Windsor
Streets in St. John's, Newfoundland and Labrador